Jasmin Krejc (born 1 January 1992) is an Austrian football goalkeeper, currently playing for SKN St. Pölten in the ÖFB-Frauenliga.

She is a member of the Austrian national team.

References

1992 births
Living people
Austrian women's footballers
FSK St. Pölten-Spratzern players
Women's association football goalkeepers
ÖFB-Frauenliga players